Randal Ford is an American photographer and portraitist notable for his work The Animal Kingdom, as well as his photography for Texas Monthly. Based in Austin, his work has been featured in TIME Magazine, Texas Monthly, and Communication Arts. In contrast to other photographers and institutions that capture images of animals, Randal Ford's work seeks to photograph animals in studio to give the impression that "the animals are introducing themselves."

Early life 
Randal Ford grew up in Dallas, where he attended Highland Park High School. He graduated from Texas A&M University, where he studied business and dabbled in photography through shooting for the student newspaper. While studying at the university, Ford was influenced by Richard Avedon's work, In the American West, "that captured the spirit of place through people Avedon encountered at slaughterhouses, ranches, and state fairs."

Career 
Randal Ford began his career as a wildlife photographer with a photoshoot in a rural area of Texas, near the city of Waco, that highlighted farm life. This was featured in Dairy Today. Inspired by Richard Avedon, Randal Ford uses the aesthetic promulgated In the American West, making "Head-on portraits with a no-frills sensibility", except centered on animals, rather than on persons. Ford, in explaining his reasoning in photographing animals, stated:

The Animal Kingdom took two years to complete, with Randal Ford spending time on both commercial and editorial photography. The animals featured in the work were sometimes obtained from Hollywood Animals and Cat Haven; the photoshoots themselves were done using a professional-grade Nikon D850. The one hundred and fifty animals that Ford captured for this project included a brown goat, mountain lion, bull, duck, chimpanzee, skunk, peacock, cheetah, great horned owl, two-toed sloth, African elephant and American buffalo, among others. The Animal Kingdom placed number one in the International Photo Awards competition in 2017. The Animal Kingdom: A Collection of Portraits is published by Rizzoli and Funds collected from purchases of The Animal Kingdom are dispatched to Project Survival’s Cat Haven, a park engaged in the preservation of wild cats.

Randal Ford has photographically recreated covers for L.L.Bean, including antique covers, as well as vintage illustrations, for modern use.

The cover story of the August 2013 issue of TIME Magazine discussed "the growing trend of childless couples in America" and its illustrations were photographed by Randal Ford, who stated that his "goal for the cover was to show two people as a family unit". He similarly recreated the 1961 cover for Field & Stream. Ford has shot more than twenty covers for the Texas Monthly magazine.

Randal Ford's portraits formed the basis for the book The Amazing Faith of Texas, a survey of the various faiths followed by the residents of the American state of Texas. The book was published by the University of Texas Press.

References

External links 
Randal Ford (Fine Art Website)
Randal Ford (Portfolio Website) 
Gallery: photographs by Randal Ford - World Wildlife Fund
Wildly Personified by MP Mueller - Tribeza

American photographers
People from Austin, Texas
Texas A&M University alumni